This is a list of Kenyan first-class cricketers. First-class cricket matches are those between international teams or the highest standard of domestic teams in which teams have two innings each. Generally, matches are eleven players a side but there have been exceptions. Today all matches must be scheduled to have at least three days' duration; historically, matches were played to a finish with no pre-defined timespan. This list is not limited to those who have played first-class cricket for Kenya and may include Kenyan players who played their first-class cricket elsewhere. The list is in alphabetical order.

See also
Kenya national cricket team
List of Kenyan ODI cricketers

References
Kenyan players at CricketArchive
East African players at Cricket Archive

First-class